The 2021 FIG World Cup circuit in Artistic Gymnastics is a series of competitions officially organized and promoted by the International Gymnastics Federation (FIG) in 2021. A number of events were originally scheduled to take place in 2020 and serve as opportunities for gymnasts to earn points towards Olympic qualification. However, the organization of many events was heavily affected by the worldwide COVID-19 pandemic, resulting in either cancelation or postponement of some events to 2021.

One of the Apparatus World Cup series competitions (Doha), as well as the Stuttgart, Birmingham, and Tokyo All-Around World Cups will be counted towards Olympic qualification through the FIG Artistic Gymnastics World Cup series route.

Schedule

Events highlighted in green will serve as Olympic qualification events.

World Cup series

World Challenge Cup series

Events canceled

Medalists

Men

World Cup series

Apparatus

World Challenge Cup series

2020–21 World Challenge Cup series winners

Women

World Cup series

Apparatus

World Challenge Cup series

2020–21 World Challenge Cup series winners

Medal table

Overall

Men

Women

See also
 2021 FIG Rhythmic Gymnastics World Cup series

References

FIG Artistic Gymnastics World Cup Series, 2021
Artistic Gymnastics World Cup